Keelaperumalaiis is a small remote hamlet in Thiruthuraipoondi constituency. It is 10 km from Thiruthuraipoondi. This village is just 2 km away from the East Coast Road. There is a sivan temple, Angala amman temple and Lord Krishna temple. The livelihood of the village is Agriculture as like more Indian villages.

Villages in Tiruvarur district